Line U3 is a line on the Vienna U-Bahn metro system.

Stations
Line U3 currently serves the following stations:
  (transfer to:  -  park & ride facility)
 
 
 
 
 
 
 
 
 
 
 
 
 
 
 
  ( park & ride facility)
 
 
 
 

References

External links
 

U3
Railway lines opened in 1991
1991 establishments in Austria